Carol Pat Christian (born 1962) is an American former professional tennis player.

Biography
Christian grew up in San Bernardino, California and while at Pacific High School won back to back Southern Section doubles titles, with Pat Shellhammer.

Collegiate tennis
In 1980 and 1981, Christian played collegiate women's tennis at Cal State Fullerton for Titans Head Coach Jan Billings.

Professional tennis
As a professional player she reached a best singles ranking of 111 in the world. Her best performance in a grand slam tournament was a third round appearance at the 1988 Australian Open. Christian had a WTA professional record of 45 wins and 47 losses during her career.

References

External links
 
 

1962 births
Living people
American female tennis players
Cal State Fullerton Titans athletes
Tennis people from California
Sportspeople from San Bernardino, California
College women's tennis players in the United States